Oncopera brunneata is a moth of the family Hepialidae. It is found in eastern Australia.

The larvae feed on dead leaves.

References

Moths described in 1933
Hepialidae